The Big 80's is a series of music videos broadcast on VH1 starting in 1995 and sporadically airing until 2000. The show ran for 90 minutes.

External links

VH1 original programming
VH1 music shows
1990s American music television series
1997 American television series debuts
2000s American music television series
2000 American television series endings